The following article presents a summary of the 2016 football (soccer) season in Brazil, which was the 115th season of competitive football in the country.

Campeonato Brasileiro Série A

The 2016 Campeonato Brasileiro Série A started on May 14, 2016, and concluded on December 11, 2016.

América Mineiro
Atlético Mineiro
Atlético Paranaense
Botafogo
Chapecoense
Corinthians
Coritiba
Cruzeiro
Figueirense
Flamengo
Fluminense
Grêmio
Internacional
Palmeiras
Ponte Preta
Santa Cruz
Santos
São Paulo
Sport
Vitória

Palmeiras won the Campeonato Brasileiro Série A.

Relegation
The four worst placed teams, which are Internacional, Figueirense, Santa Cruz and América Mineiro, were relegated to the following year's second level.

Campeonato Brasileiro Série B

The 2016 Campeonato Brasileiro Série B started on May 13, 2016, and concluded on November 26, 2016.

Atlético Goianiense
Avaí
Bahia
Bragantino
Brasil de Pelotas
Ceará
CRB
Criciúma
Goiás
Joinville
Luverdense
Londrina
Náutico
Oeste
Paraná
Paysandu
Sampaio Corrêa
Tupi
Vasco da Gama
Vila Nova

Atlético Goianiense won the Campeonato Brasileiro Série B.

Promotion
The four best placed teams, which are Atlético Goianiense, Avaí, Vasco da Gama and Bahia, were promoted to the following year's first level.

Relegation
The four worst placed teams, which are Joinville, Tupi, Bragantino and Sampaio Corrêa, were relegated to the following year's third level.

Campeonato Brasileiro Série C

The 2016 Campeonato Brasileiro Série C started on May 21, 2016, and concluded on November 5, 2016.

ABC
América de Natal
ASA
Boa Esporte
Botafogo-PB
Botafogo-SP
Confiança
Cuiabá
Fortaleza
Guarani
Guaratinguetá
Juventude
Macaé
Mogi Mirim
Portuguesa
Remo
Ríver
Salgueiro
Tombense
Ypiranga de Erechim

The Campeonato Brasileiro Série C final was played between Boa Esporte and Guarani.

Boa Esporte won the league after beating Guarani by aggregate score of 4–1.

Promotion
The four best placed teams, which are Boa Esporte, Guarani, ABC  and Juventude, were promoted to the following year's second level.

Relegation
The four worst placed teams, which are América de Natal, Portuguesa, Ríver and Guaratinguetá, were relegated to the following year's fourth level.

Campeonato Brasileiro Série D

The 2016 Campeonato Brasileiro Série D started on June 12, 2016, and concluded on October 2, 2016.

Águia de Marabá
Altos
América-PE
Aparecidense
Anápolis
Araguaia
Atlético Acreano
Audax
Baré
Boavista
Brusque
Caldense
Campinense
Caxias
Ceilândia
Central
Comercial
CSA
Desportiva Ferroviária
Espírito Santo
Fluminense de Feira
Galícia
Genus
Globo
Goianésia
Guarani
Icasa
Internacional de Lages
Itabaiana
Ituano
J. Malucelli
Juazeirense
Linense
Luziânia
Madureira
Maranhão
Maringá
Metropolitano
Moto Club
Murici
Nacional
Náutico-RR
Novo Hamburgo
Palmas
Parnahyba
Portuguesa-RJ
Potiguar
Princesa do Solimões
PSTC
Rio Branco
Rondoniense
Santos-AP
São Bento
São Francisco
São José-RS
São Paulo-RS
São Raimundo
Sergipe
Serra Talhada
Sete de Setembro
Sinop
Sousa
Tocantinópolis
Trem
Uniclinic
URT
Villa Nova
Volta Redonda

The Campeonato Brasileiro Série D final was played between Volta Redonda and CSA.

Volta Redonda won the league after beating CSA by aggregate score of 4–0.

Promotion
The four best placed teams, which are Volta Redonda, CSA, São Bento and Moto Club, were promoted to the following year's third level.

Domestic cups

Copa do Brasil

The competition started on March 16, 2016, and concluded on December 7, 2016. The Copa do Brasil final was played between Atlético Mineiro and Grêmio.

Grêmio won the cup by aggregate score of 4–1.

Copa do Nordeste

The competition featured 20 clubs from the Northeastern region. It started on February 14, 2016 and concluded on May 1, 2016. The Copa do Nordeste final was played between Santa Cruz and Campinense.

Santa Cruz won the cup after defeating Campinense.

Copa Verde

The competition featured 18 clubs from the North and Central-West regions, including Espírito Santo champions. It started on February 6, 2016 and concluded on May 10, 2016. The Copa Verde final was played between Paysandu and Gama.

Paysandu won the cup after defeating Gama.

Primeira Liga

The competition featured 12 clubs from the South and Southeastern regions, including Minas Gerais and Rio de Janeiro State teams.  It started on January 27, 2016 and concluded on April 20, 2016. The Primeira Liga final was played between Fluminense and Atlético Paranaense.

Fluminense won the cup after defeating Atlético Paranaense 1–0.

State championship champions

Youth competition champions

(1) The Copa Nacional do Espírito Santo Sub-17, between 2008 and 2012, was named Copa Brasil Sub-17. The similar named Copa do Brasil Sub-17 is organized by the Brazilian Football Confederation and it was first played in 2013.

Other competition champions

Brazilian clubs in international competitions

Brazil national team
The following table lists all the games played by the Brazilian national team in official competitions and friendly matches during 2016.

Friendlies

Copa América Centenario

2018 FIFA World Cup qualification

Women's football

National team
The following table lists all the games played by the Brazil women's national football team in official competitions and friendly matches during 2016.

Friendlies

Algarve Cup

Summer Olympics

Torneio de Manaus 

The Brazil women's national football team competed in the following competitions in 2016:

Campeonato Brasileiro de Futebol Feminino

The 2016 Campeonato Brasileiro de Futebol Feminino started on January 20, 2016, and concluded on May 25, 2016. The Campeonato Brasileiro de Futebol Feminino final was played between Flamengo/Marinha and Rio Preto.

Flamengo/Marinha won the league after defeating Rio Preto.

Copa do Brasil de Futebol Feminino

The 2016 Copa do Brasil de Futebol Feminino started on August 24, 2016, and concluded on October 26, 2016. The Copa do Brasil de Futebol Feminino final was played between Corinthians/Audax and São José.

Corinthians/Audax won the league after defeating São José.

Domestic competition champions

Brazilian clubs in international competitions

References

 Brazilian competitions at RSSSF

 
Seasons in Brazilian football